Mohammad Hossein Mohebbi (born September 6, 1956) was captain of Iran freestyle wrestling national team. He won a silver medal at the 1978 World Championships and a gold at the 1982 Asian Games. He is frequently confused with his twin brother Mohammad Hassan Mohebbi, who competed alongside, but in a heavier category (90 kg).

References 

1956 births
Living people
Iranian male sport wrestlers
World Wrestling Championships medalists
Asian Games gold medalists for Iran
Asian Games bronze medalists for Iran
Asian Games medalists in wrestling
Wrestlers at the 1982 Asian Games
Medalists at the 1982 Asian Games
Wrestlers at the 1986 Asian Games
Medalists at the 1986 Asian Games
Sportspeople from Kermanshah
Asian Wrestling Championships medalists
20th-century Iranian people
21st-century Iranian people